Monodontides musina, the Swinhoe's hedge blue, is a butterfly of the family Lycaenidae. It is found in South-East Asia, including India.

Description
Male underside: pale lilacine grey. Forewing: costa bordered by a slender line, termen by a comparatively broad and even band of dusky black, the latter diffuse along its inner margin. Hindwing: costal margin diffusely dusky black, termen with a slender black anteciliary line; dorsal margin narrowly pale. Underside: white with a slight tinge of blue. Forewing: a short line on the discocellulars, a postdiscal transverse series of six abbreviated lines pointing obliquely outwards and en echelon one with the other, the uppermost shifted well inwards, followed by a subterminal series of transverse spots enclosed between an inner subterminal, lunular, transverse line and an outer anteciliary slender line, pale brown. Hindwing: a transverse subbasal series of three, sometimes four, minute spots and a spot beyond on the dorsum, with a larger subcostal spot near the apex of the wing, black; a short slender line on the discocellulars and some irregular dots on the disc pale brown; terminal markings as on the forewing. Cilia of both forewings and hindwings whitish. Antenna, head, thorax and abdomen dark brown, the antennae ringed with white beneath: the palpi, thorax and abdomen white.

Female upperside, forewing: a broad border to the costal and terminal margins dusky black, the rest of the wing iridescent light blue; on the costa the lower edge of the black traverses the middle of the cell, on the apex and termen it occupies the outer fourth of the wing. Hindwing: anterior third dusky black, the rest of the wing pale lilacine glossed with iridescent blue in certain lights; a subterminal series of dusky black spots that more or less coalesces with an anteciliary dusky black hue and is enclosed on the inner side by a slender similarly-coloured lunular line. The underside, antennae, head, thorax and abdomen as in the male.

Taxonomy
The butterfly was earlier known as Lycaenopsis musina Swinhoe.

Subspecies

 Monodontides musina musina (Java, Malaysia)
 Monodontides musina musinoides (Swinhoe, 1910) (north-eastern India, Burma, northern Thailand, Yunnan)
 Monodontides musina pelides (Fruhstorfer, 1910) (southern Laos, southern Vietnam)

See also
List of butterflies of India
List of butterflies of India (Lycaenidae)

References

  
 

Monodontides
Butterflies described in 1892
Butterflies of Asia